The 1912 International cricket season was from April 1912 to August 1912.

Season overview

May

Test trial in England

1912 Triangular Tournament

June

South Africa in Scotland

July

Australia in Scotland

South Africa in Ireland

August

Australia in England

Scotland in Ireland

References

1912 in cricket